Gallapo is a town and an administrative ward in the Babati Rural District of the Manyara Region of Tanzania. According to the 2002 census, the ward has a total population of 16,791.

According to the 2012 census, the ward has a population of 19,578.

References

Babati District
Wards of Manyara Region